Aku no Hana (悪の華) (Literal translation: "Evil's flowers") is the third single released by the Japanese rock band Buck Tick, released on January 24, 1990, and labeled with Victor Entertainment.

The song ranked first in the Oricon Chart selling 104,470 copies during the first week of February 1990. Starting this point the band began to gain popularity.

Track listing

Musicians
 Atsushi Sakurai – Voice
 Hisashi Imai – Guitar
 Hidehiko Hoshino – Guitar
 Yutaka Higuchi – Bass
 Toll Yagami – Drums

References

External links
 

1990 singles
Buck-Tick songs
Songs with music by Hisashi Imai
1990 songs
Victor Entertainment singles
Songs with lyrics by Atsushi Sakurai
Oricon Weekly number-one singles